Corinth is an unincorporated community in Panola County, Texas, United States.

History
Corinth was settled in the 1860s and developed around the Corinth Church. The community had a school by the 1890s, which closed sometime after the 1930s. By the 1960s Corinth consisted of the church, a cemetery, and several scattered homes.

References

Unincorporated communities in Panola County, Texas
Unincorporated communities in Texas